Shawn A. Bohner is an American computer scientist working as a professor of computer science and engineering at the Rose–Hulman Institute of Technology. He is also the co-editor-in-chief of Innovations in Systems and Software Engineering.

Education 
Bohner earned a Bachelor of Science degree from the University of Maryland, College Park, a Master of Science from Johns Hopkins University, and a PhD from George Mason University.

Career 
Prior to joining the Rose–Hulman Institute of Technology, Bohner was a professor of computer science at Virginia Tech and Colorado Technical University. He was also the director of the National Science Foundation's Center for High Performance Reconfigurable Computing. In 2010, Bohner was a member of the editorial advisory board of the Encyclopedia of Software Engineering.

References 

American computer scientists
University of Maryland, College Park alumni
Johns Hopkins University alumni
George Mason University alumni
Virginia Tech faculty
Year of birth missing (living people)
Living people